The Jervis-White-Jervis Baronetcy, of Bally Ellis in the County Wexford, was a title in the Baronetage of Ireland.  It was created on 6 December 1797 for John Jervis-White-Jervis.  The 4th baronet was a colonel in the Royal Artillery. The title became extinct on the death of the fifth Baronet in 1947.

Jervis-White-Jervis baronets, of Bally Ellis (1797)
 Sir John Jervis-White-Jervis, 1st Baronet (1765–1830)
 Sir Henry Meredyth Jervis-White-Jervis, 2nd Baronet (1793–1869)
 Sir Humphrey Charles Jervis-White-Jervis, 3rd Baronet (1821–1887)
 Sir John Henry Jervis-White-Jervis, 4th Baronet (1857–1943)
 Sir Henry Felix Jervis-White-Jervis, 5th Baronet (1859–1947)

References
 

Extinct baronetcies in the Baronetage of Ireland